Pullman is an unincorporated community in Lee Township, Allegan County, in the U.S. state of Michigan. The Upper, Lower, and Western Scott Lakes are nearby, which empty into the Scott Creek Drain, a tributary of the Middle Branch of the Black River.

Two brothers named Clement built a sawmill in 1870. A station on the Chicago and West Michigan Railway (later part of the Pere Marquette Railway) was established in 1871 and the area became known as "Hoppertown", after an area landowner. A post office with that name operated from 1875 to 1880 and began again in 1891. The post office was renamed Pullman in 1901, apparently after George Pullman. The ZIP code for Pullman is 49450.

References

Unincorporated communities in Allegan County, Michigan
Unincorporated communities in Michigan